Goro (Ferrarese: , but locally ) is a comune (municipality) in the Province of Ferrara in the Italian region Emilia-Romagna, located about  northeast of Bologna and about  east of Ferrara, near the mouth of the Po River.

Goro borders the following municipalities: Ariano nel Polesine, Codigoro, Mesola.

Twin towns
 Pontinia, Italy

Important people
 Romualdo Rossi (1877-1968)  writer, editor and journalist.
 Milva (1939–2021) singer, stage and film actress, and television personality.
 Piergiorgio Farina (1933–2008) jazz violinist, composer and singer.

References

External links
 Official website

Cities and towns in Emilia-Romagna